Tiffany Day was an Australian judoka, who played for the extra-lightweight category. She was a 2007 Australian judo champion for her weight division, and a member of Pittsworth Judo Club under her personal coach, Patrick Mahoon.

Day represented Australia at the 2008 Summer Olympics in Beijing, where she competed for the women's extra-lightweight class (48 kg). She received a bye for the second preliminary round match, before losing out to Argentina's Paula Pareto, who successfully scored an ippon (full point) with a yoko shiho gatame (side four quarter hold), at one minute and twenty seconds.

Tiffany Day died unexpectedly on 9 April 2019 at the age of 29.

References

External links
Profile – Australian Olympic Team

NBC Olympics Profile

1990 births
2019 deaths
Australian female judoka
Judoka at the 2008 Summer Olympics
Olympic judoka of Australia
Sportspeople from Toowoomba
21st-century Australian women